Princess Amelia was launched in 1786 as an East Indiaman for the British East India Company (EIC). She made four voyages to India for the EIC and was lost in April 1798 to a fire off the Malabar Coast.

Career
EIC voyage #1 (1787–1788): Captain Stephen Williams sailed from The Downs on 19 February 1787, bound for Madras and Bengal. Princess Amelia was at Madeira on 13 March, reached Madras on 8 July, and arrived at Diamond Harbour on 21 July. Homeward bound, she was at Saugor on 7 March 1788. She returned to Madras on 26 March, reached St Helena on 1 July, and arrived at The Downs on 31 August.

EIC voyage #2 (1790–1791): Captain George Millett sailed from The Downs on 25 March 1790, bound for Bengal. Princess Amelia arrived at Diamond Harbour on 2 August. Homeward bound, she was at Saugor on 3 December, reached the Cape of Good Hope on 26 January 1791 and St Helena on 14 February, and arrived at The Downs on 20 April.

EIC voyage #3 (1793–1794): Captain Millett sailed from Portsmouth on 5 Apr 1793, bound for Madras and Bengal.  Princess Amelia reached Madras on 14 August and arrived at Diamond Harbour on 7 September. Homeward bound, she was at Saugor on 9 November, reached St Helena on 11 February 1794, and arrived at The Downs on 30 April.

EIC voyage #4 (1795–1796): War with France had broken out during Princess Amelias last voyage. Captain Millett acquired a letter of marque on 3 April 1795. He sailed from Portsmouth on 24 May, bound for Bombay. Princess Amelia arrived at Bombay on 3 September. Homeward bound, she reached St Helena on 22 March 1796 and arrived at The Downs on 3 August.

Loss
Captain John Ramsden took over command of Princess Amelia for her next voyage. He had just lost , another ship owned by Robert Williams. He acquired a letter of marque on 10 March 1797.

Captain Ramsden sailed from Portsmouth on 6 April 1797, bound for Bombay, on what was Princess Amelias fifth voyage for the EIC.

The fire, of unknown origin, began in the aft hold around 1a.m., and developed so quickly nothing could be saved. Sixteen crew and 24 passengers died; 80 crew and 59 passengers survived. It appears that , which was on her way to Tellichery, picked up the survivors. The French put ashore the captains, crews, and passengers, together with their baggage, they had captured.)

The EIC put the value of the cargo it lost when Princess Amelia burned at £22,061.

Post script
Captain Ramsden was among the sea captains who provided testimonials in support of Thomas Earnshaw's chronometer. Ramsden had gotten his Earnshaw chronometer from Captain Millet and used it on his ill-fated voyage to Bombay.

Citations and references
Citations

References
 
 
  
 

1786 ships
Ships built in Deptford
Age of Sail merchant ships of England
Ships of the British East India Company
Maritime incidents in 1798
Ship fires
Shipwrecks of India
Shipwrecks in the Indian Ocean